The following highways are numbered 628:

United States